Lorae Ann Parry  is a New Zealand playwright and actor.

Biography and education 
She was born in 1955 in Sydney, Australia and in 1970 moved to New Zealand. Parry has two qualifications, a Diploma in Acting from Toi Whakaari, the national New Zealand Drama School in 1976, and a Master in Scriptwriting from Victoria University of Wellington.

Career 
A noted feminist playwright, Parry's plays often explore sexuality, gender, and class systems. Her first plays, Strip, and Frontwomen, used a combination of realism and humor to promote empowerment of women and more acceptance of lesbianism. The play Frontwomen was a breakthrough in history when it was the first lesbian play performed in New Zealand. However, her most influential play, Eugenia, was published in 1996 and explored the nature of sexuality and gender, as well as challenging social traditions around females. Eugenia is noted for its mixing of the magical and supernatural with the true historical figure Eugene Falleni, an Italian-Australian transgender man convicted of the 1917 murder of his first wife. Parry constantly focuses on empowering women through theatre and through her plays, she focuses on the importance of women's lives. She continues to be active in women's issues through play publishing and theatre.

Parry is a performer including being part of the Crows Feet Dance Collective, a dance company for women with a lowest age limit of 40 years. She is known for her stage impersonation of former New Zealand prime minister Helen Clark.

Plays
(1986) Strip 
(1992) Digger & Nudger Try Harder, co-written by Carmel McGlone
(1993) Frontwomen
(1994) Cracks
(1996) Eugenia
(2002) Vagabonds
(2003) The Truth About Loven, co-written by Pinky Agnew
(2006) The Candidates, co-written Pinky Agnew
(2008) Kate & Mrs Jones
(2010) Bloomsbury Women & The Wild Colonial Girl
(2010) Sex Drive, co-written by Pinky Agnew
(2014) Destination Beehive, co-written by Pinky Agnew
(2016) Scarlet & Gold

Film
(1988) ''Send a Gorilla as Sender of revenge gram

Honours and awards
 1994 – Awarded Stout Fellowship, Victoria University of Wellington 
 1995 – The Reader's Digest PEN Stout Research Centre Fellowship
 1998 – Writer in Residence, Victoria University of Wellington. Parry was the first female playwright to achieve this award.
 2004 – Appointed a Member of the New Zealand Order of Merit, for services to the performing arts, in the 2004 New Year Honours

References

Living people
20th-century New Zealand dramatists and playwrights
New Zealand women dramatists and playwrights
Victoria University of Wellington alumni
Members of the New Zealand Order of Merit
21st-century New Zealand dramatists and playwrights
20th-century New Zealand women writers
21st-century New Zealand women writers
1955 births
Toi Whakaari alumni